Andrew Squire may refer to:
 Andrew Squire (cricketer)
 Andrew Squire (bowls)